A. poeppigii may refer to:

 Aechmea poeppigii, a plant native to the West Indies, Costa Rica, Panama, and northern South America
 Angadenia poeppigii, a plant native to the Americas